Pennies From Heaven is a 1936 American musical comedy film directed by Norman Z. McLeod and starring Bing Crosby, Madge Evans, and Edith Fellows.

Jo Swerling's screenplay was based on the novel The Peacock Feather by Leslie Moore. The film is about a singer wrongly imprisoned who promises a condemned fellow inmate that he will help the family of his victim when he is released. The singer delays his dream of becoming a gondolier in Venice and becomes a street singer in order to help the young girl and her elderly grandfather. His life is further complicated when he meets a beautiful welfare worker who takes a dim view of the young girl's welfare and initiates proceedings to have her put in an orphanage.

Pennies From Heaven remains most noteworthy for Crosby's introduction of the titular song, a Depression-era favorite, since recorded by numerous singers. The film features Louis Armstrong in a supporting role. In 1937, the film received an Oscar nomination for Best Original Song (Arthur Johnston and Johnny Burke).

This was Crosby’s first independent production jointly with Emanuel Cohen’s Major Pictures and he had a share in the profits. The film was distributed by Columbia Pictures.

Plot
In prison, Larry Poole, a self-described troubadour, is approached by an inmate named Hart who is on his way to the electric chair. Hart asks Larry to deliver a letter to a family called Smith near Middletown, New Jersey. After finding the family, which consists of a grandfather and a young girl named Patsy, Poole tells them that the letter holds a key, reveals that the condemned man had unintentionally killed Patsy's father and that he is giving the Smith family his old house and former hideout, the only thing he has to give as atonement.

Susan Sprague represents the county welfare department and it is her job to see that Patsy is raised "properly", or the girl will go to an orphanage. A variety of misadventures befall Larry as he tries to help "Gramps" out with Patsy to save her from the orphanage, all while Susan and he are falling in love.

To get cash for a restaurant license, Larry gets a stunt job at the circus, but is injured. While he is in hospital Gramps comes to let him know that the county has taken Patsy away.  Larry believes Susan went behind his back and had Patsy placed in the orphanage. It is discovered that Susan had no part in it, but she loses her job defending Larry and his care of the child.

Larry has the circus perform for the children so that he can 'break Patsy out', when Patsy lets Larry know how Susan feels about him. Their attempt to free Patsy fails. Afterwards, Larry finds out that Susan has gone to New York and he goes there to find her.

While in New York, Susan is approached by two policemen looking for Larry, not to arrest him as she suspects, but to bring him back to the head of the County Welfare Department to help deal with Patsy, who has gone on a hunger strike. The policemen are watching Susan's apartment in the hopes that Larry will show up. When he does, they make him leave with them, after he and Susan reveal their feelings for each other.

When they return to the orphanage, the head of the welfare department begs Larry to help them with Patsy. Larry agrees to adopt Patsy and raise her with the help of Susan, who agrees to marry him and be a mother to Patsy.

Cast
 Bing Crosby as Larry Poole
 Madge Evans as Susan Sprague
 Edith Fellows as Patsy Smith
 Louis Armstrong ¤ as Henry
 Donald Meek as Gramp Smith
 John Gallaudet as J. C. Hart
 William Stack as Clarence B. Carmichael
 Nana Bryant as Miss Howard
 Tom Dugan as Crowbar Miller
 George Chandler as Waiter
 Nydia Westman as Slavey

¤ Although this was not the first time that a black performer was given prominent billing in a major Hollywood release (Paul Robeson had been billed fourth in that same year's Show Boat), special billing was given to Armstrong at the insistence of Bing Crosby, who also insisted on Armstrong's being hired for the movie.

Reception
Frank S. Nugent of The New York Times commented, inter alia, "Conceding that Mr. Crosby is as good-natured as ever and that Miss Evans is so attractive a social worker that we are tempted to apply for relief and be investigated, the chief honors properly belong to little Miss Fellows. Hers really is an exceptional performance for a youngster, skirting the perils of bathos in her tender scenes and playing her rebellious ones with comic impertinence. Mr. Meek as the grandfather, Nana Bryant as the harried superintendent of an orphanage and William Stack as a welfare commissioner are excellent in the supporting rôles. In sum, “Pennies from Heaven” is one of Mr. Crosby’s best."

Variety: "Pennies from Heaven may qualify as a fair grosser because of Crosby’s name, but basically it’s a weak picture with a story that has little movement and only a scattered few mild giggles. It’s spread pretty thin over 80 minutes, despite a good tuneful score which should be no handicap… Film won’t advance Crosby although Crosby may overcome its faults to some extent. Best individual impression is by Louis Armstrong, Negro cornetist and hi-de-ho expert. Not as an eccentric musician, but as a Negro comedian he suggests possibilities. He toots his solo horn to a nice individual score, plus his band chores. Crosby has a couple of songs that will be reprised into fair popularity..."

Soundtrack
 "Pennies from Heaven" (Arthur Johnston and Johnny Burke) played during the opening credits, as background music, and sung by Bing Crosby
 "Skeleton in the Closet" (Arthur Johnston and Johnny Burke) by Louis Armstrong and His Band
 "So Do I" (Arthur Johnston and Johnny Burke) by Bing Crosby and danced by Edith Fellows; reprised by Crosby at the orphanage and in the New York City montage
 "One, Two, Button Your Shoe" (Arthur Johnston and Johnny Burke) by Bing Crosby at the orphanage; reprised by a marching band
 "Let's Call a Heart a Heart" (Arthur Johnston and Johnny Burke) by Bing Crosby with Louis Armstrong and His Band; played also as background music
 "Old MacDonald Had a Farm" (Traditional) by Bing Crosby, Edith Fellows, and Donald Meek on the hay wagon

Bing Crosby recorded his solos for Decca Records. They all enjoyed chart successes with "Pennies from Heaven" topping the hit parade for ten weeks. Crosby's songs were also included in the Bing's Hollywood series.

Awards
Arthur Johnston and Johnny Burke were nominated for the Academy Award for Best Original Song for the music and lyrics respectively of "Pennies from Heaven".

The film is recognized by American Film Institute in these lists:
 2004: AFI's 100 Years...100 Songs:	
 "Pennies from Heaven" – Nominated

References

External links
 
 
 

1936 films
1930s musical comedy-drama films
American musical comedy-drama films
American black-and-white films
Columbia Pictures films
Films based on British novels
Films directed by Norman Z. McLeod
Films with screenplays by Jo Swerling
1936 comedy films
1936 drama films
1930s English-language films
1930s American films